Didiemba is a town in Coalla Department, Gnagna Province, Burkina Faso. The town has a population of 1,042.

References

Populated places in the Est Region (Burkina Faso)
Gnagna Province